The Anna was an orphaned motor, whose origin and manufacturer are unknown, other than that it was discovered in America. It had two seats and was fitted with what was called a "Democrat" body on an 8-foot 4 inch wheelbase. Its water-cooled 2-cylinder engine displaced 2.8 liters. It had a planetary transmission and roller chain.

Vintage vehicles
Defunct motor vehicle manufacturers of the United States